Republican Front may refer to:

 Republican Front (Burkina Faso)
 Republican Front (Catalonia)
 Republican Front (France)
 Republican Front (Zimbabwe)
 Republican Front of Guatemala
 United Democratic Republican Front